Luna Mágica (Spanish for "Magic Moon") is the ring name of Maria De Los Angeles Aranda Ramirez (born January 10, 1978 in Ciudad Madero, Tamaulipas, Mexico). Aranda is a Mexican luchadora, or female professional wrestler currently working for the Mexican professional wrestling promotion Consejo Mundial de Lucha Libre (CMLL) portraying a tecnico ("Good guy") wrestling character.

Personal life
Maria Aranda and Consejo Mundial de Lucha Libre (CMLL) Booking team member Franco Colombo have at least one child together, born in early 2009. Aranda took over 18 months off from wrestling while pregnant, followed by complications to her pregnancy that led her to have a longer recovery period than expected. She is the sister of CMLL and independent circuit wrestler Estrella Mágica ("Magic Star")

Professional wrestling career
Aranda made her professional wrestling debut in 1996, working under the ring name Luna Mágica, initially competing on the independent circuit including the Monterrey based Lucha Libre Femenil promotion. In 2005 CMLL restarted their women's division, adding a number of female competitors to their roster including Luna Mágica. On April 27, 2007 Luna Mágica competed to in a tournament to crown a new Mexican National Women's Champion when previous champion Lady Apache won the higher ranked CMLL World Women's Championship. She was one of 14 women competing in a torneo cibernetico to qualify for the finals. The torneo cibernetico elimination match was won by Marcela and Princesa Sujei, eliminating Luna Mágica. In 2010 Luna Mágica developed a long running rivalry with Princesa Blanca, building the storyline to the point where the two agreed to wager their hair on the outcome of a Luchas de Apuestas (Bet match) between the two. The two met on October 17, 2010 in Arena Mexico where Princesa Blanca defeated Luna Mágica, who was shaved completely bald after loss to Princesa Blanca. On December 6, 2011 during a CMLL show Luna Mágica and Lluvia defeated La Comandante and Zeuix to win the Reina World Tag Team Championship, a title promoted by Japanese wrestling promotion Universal Woman's Pro Wrestling Reina. The victory meant that the two traveled to Japan to defend the titles in early 2012. On January 29, 2012 Lluvia and Luna Mágica successfully defended the titles against Casandra and La Silueta. Later on the team would successfully defend the titles against the team of Aoi Ishibashi and Aki Kanbayashi. Near the end of their tour of Japan, on March 24, the team lost the championship to Zeuxis and Mima Shimoda.

Championships and accomplishments
Universal Woman's Pro Wrestling Reina
Reina World Tag Team Championship (1 time) – with Lluvia

Luchas de Apuestas record

Footnotes

References

Mexican female professional wrestlers
Living people
1978 births
Professional wrestlers from Tamaulipas
20th-century professional wrestlers
21st-century professional wrestlers
Reina World Tag Team Champions